Eppards Point Township is located in Livingston County, Illinois. As of the 2010 census, its population was 427 and it contained 139 housing units.

Geography

Demographics

References

External links
US Census
City-data.com
Illinois State Archives

Townships in Livingston County, Illinois
Livingston County, Illinois
Populated places established in 1857
Townships in Illinois
1857 establishments in Illinois